Loie Fuller is a 1901 French short black-and-white silent film. The creator is listed as "anonymous" by the Jérôme Seydoux-Pathé Foundation. Some copies have been stencil-coloured with Pathécolor process in Julienne Mathieu and Segundo de Chomon's Barcelona workshop.

Plot 
After two special effects (a flying vampire and its transmutation to a danseuse), the film depicts a serpentine dance by Loie Fuller.

See also 
 List of French films before 1910

References

External links 
 

1901 films
French black-and-white films
French short films
French silent short films
Films directed by Segundo de Chomón
Articles containing video clips
1900s dance films
French vampire films
Silent horror films
1900s French films